B. Douglas Bernheim is an American professor of Economics,   currently the Edward Ames Edmunds Professor of Economics at Stanford University; his previous  academic appointments have included an endowed chair in Economics and Business Policy at Princeton University and an endowed chair in Insurance and Risk Management at Northwestern University’s J.L. Kellogg
Graduate School of Management, Department of Finance. He has published many articles in academic journals,  and has received a number of awards recognizing his contributions to the field of economics. He is a partner with Bates White, LLC an economic consulting firm with offices in Washington, D.C., and San Diego, California.

Life and work 
Douglas Bernheim studied from 1975 to 1979 at Harvard University, where he received his Bachelor of Arts (AB), summa cum laude. In 1982, he received his PhD in economics from the Massachusetts Institute of Technology. Subsequently, he was an assistant professor (1982–1987) and associate professor (1987–1988) at Stanford University. Bernheim moved to Northwestern University to serve as the Harold J. Hines Jr. Distinguished Professor of Risk Management (1988–1990) and later moved to Princeton University (1990–1994) to serve as the John L. Weinberg Professor of Economics and Business Policy. Since 1994 he has worked again at Stanford University: From 1994 to 2005 as the Lewis and Virginia Eaton Professor and since 2005 as the Edward Ames Edmonds Professor of Economics. Since 1986, he has also conducted research for the National Bureau of Economic Research.

Bernheim works in the fields of finance, industrial organization, political economy, behavioral economics,  and microeconomics. His sister is Robin Bernheim, the noted writer/producer of many TV shows, including Remington Steele, Quantum Leap, Star Trek: Voyager, and When Calls the Heart.

Awards and affiliations 
 1978 Phi Beta Kappa
 1979 John H. Williams Prize (for best graduate in economics)
 1991 Elected Fellow, Econometric Society
 1997 Elected Fellow, American Academy of Arts and Sciences
 2001–2002 Fellow, Center for Advanced Study in the Behavioral Sciences
 2001–2002 John Simon Guggenheim Memorial Foundation Fellowship

Publications

Articles 
 
 
 The Vanishing Nest Egg. Reflections on Saving in America. Twentieth Century Fund/Priority Press, New York 1991,

References

External links 
 Stanford – Bernheim Bio
 NPER – Bernheim Bio
 Ideas – Bernheim Bio

Living people
21st-century American economists
Neuroeconomists
Behavioral economists
Northwestern University faculty
MIT School of Humanities, Arts, and Social Sciences alumni
Harvard University alumni
Stanford University Department of Economics faculty
1958 births
Fellows of the Econometric Society
Fellows of the American Academy of Arts and Sciences